The Ljubljana Synagogue is a house of prayer of the Federation of the Jewish Communities of Graz and Ljubljana, located in a residential building in the center of the Slovenian capital. It was founded, planned and realized by the president of the Jewish community in Graz Elie Rosen and is managed by the Jewish community of Graz for the Slovenian community respectively all Slovenian Jews. Before that it wasn´t possible for the Jewish community of Slovenia to build its own permanent synagogue in Ljubljana in lack of financial means. Therefore, they were dependent on makeshift arrangements.

On August 2, 2021, the Jewish Community of Graz and the Jewish Community of Slovenia, led by Elie Rosen, President of the Jewish Community of Graz, and Igor Vojtic, Vice President of the Jewish Community of Slovenia, announced the establishment of the Federation of Jewish Communities of Graz and Ljubljana. The transnational association of Jewish communities was established with the goal to reinforce and develop community life of both entities.

The opening ceremony of the synagogue of Ljubljana which is run under traditional (orthodox) rite was held on 9 November 2021 - the memorial day of the November-pogroms from 1938 – in attendance of the President of the Republic of Slovenia Borut Pahor, the Roman Catholic Archbishop msg. Stanislav Zore, Mufti of the Islamic Community in the Republic of Slovenia Nevzet Porić as well as high ranking representatives from politics, diplomacy and society. The Republic of Austria was represented by the Ambassador of Austria to Slovenia, Elisabeth Ellison-Kramer.

Hachnasat Sefer Torah 

Just before the opening of the synagogue, a delegation of The Conference of European Rabbis with Rabbis from Germany, Great Britain, France, Austria, Spain, Switzerland, Sweden and Poland attended the ceremonial introduction of the Torah scroll into the synagogue on November 3, 2021. The ceremony at the Ljubljana Synagogue took place in the presence of the Chief Rabbi of Poland, Michael Joseph Schudrich, together with the Chief Rabbi for Slovenia, Ariel Haddad, the Rabbi for the Province of Styria, Schlomo Hofmeister, and the President of the Graz Jewish Community and Synagogue Ljubljana, Elie Rosen. The Synagogue Ljubljana is the only Jewish institution of the Jewish community in the territory of the Republic of Slovenia, recognized by the Conference of European Rabbis.

The Interior 
The Synagogue Ljubljana follows a traditional (orthodox) prayer ritual: the prayer space consists of a space for men with about 45 seats and a women's section with a capacity of about 25 seats. In addition to the central rooms, the synagogue is complemented by several adjoining rooms, including a common parlour, a kiddush room and an administrative room. The wooden benches in the synagogue were made by the Israeli kibbutz Lavi, the tora shrine is the work of the Austrian-Styrian company Teammöbel from Hartberg, which also equipped the synagogue in Baden near Vienna.

One of the central features in the Synagogue Ljubljana is the blue curtain in front of the Torah shrine, designed by young Slovene fashion designer Matic Veler, who graduated from the Royal College of Art in London, UK. The curtain pattern originates from typical Jewish symbolism, tailored to the needs of the prayer room, and is based on the idea of transmitting light through a laser-cut pattern, making the reflection of the shadow form a mystical and moving environment. The placement of Veler’s pieces in spaces such as galleries, museums and now a synagogue is in line with his broader design philosophy.

External links 

Website of Synagogue Ljubjana (English Version)

References 

Synagogues in Slovenia
Buildings and structures in Ljubljana
2021 establishments in Slovenia
Judaism in Slovenia